South-Central Colorado is a region of the U.S. state of Colorado. It can be roughly defined by Chaffee County in the northwest, El Paso County in the northeast, Las Animas County in the southeast, and Conejos County in the southwest. Some notable towns and cities there include Colorado Springs, Pueblo, Cripple Creek, Cañon City, Salida, Buena Vista, Monte Vista, Alamosa, Walsenburg, and Trinidad. The landscapes of South-Central Colorado were made known to the Western world by the explorations of Zebulon Pike and Kit Carson, who were later followed by settlers, many of whom came by the Santa Fe Trail. The upper tributaries of the Arkansas River and South Platte River provide ample whitewater rafting and are famous for trout and bass fishing in scenic settings such as Royal Gorge. Much of the local economic system is dependent on mining, forestry, ranching, and tourism related to these endeavors. South-Central Colorado has so far largely escaped urbanization, allowing visitors to experience something of the American Old West.

Counties

Alamosa County
Chaffee County
Conejos County
Costilla County
Custer County
El Paso County
Fremont County
Huerfano County
Las Animas County
Park County
Pueblo County
Rio Grande County
Saguache County
Teller County

References

See also

Geography of Colorado

Regions of Colorado
Tourism regions of Colorado